CBS Reports is the umbrella title used for documentaries by CBS News which aired starting in 1959 through the 1990s. The series sometimes aired as a wheel series rotating with 60 Minutes (or other similar CBS News series), as a series of its own, or as specials. The program aired as a constant series from 1959 to 1971.

Origin
CBS Reports premiered on October 27, 1959. It was intended to be a successor to Edward R. Murrow's influential See It Now, which had ended 15 months prior, and employed several members of the See It Now production staff. For the remainder of 1959 and through 1960, CBS Reports was broadcast on an irregular basis as a series of specials.

The network gave CBS Reports a regular primetime slot in January 1961, at 10 p.m. (EST) on Thursdays. That placed it against two "tremendously popular" established shows, The Untouchables on ABC and Sing Along With Mitch on NBC. Consequently, CBS Reports was pre-empted by a high number of CBS affiliates that aired local programming in its timeslot.

When the networks announced their Fall 1962 schedules, Sing Along With Mitch and The Untouchables had been moved from the Thursday 10 p.m. timeslot. However, CBS also decided to move CBS Reports to Wednesday at 7:30 p.m. (EST), explaining that "the earlier hour will permit more young people to watch the program." But that move again put the program up against two "consistent rating leaders," The Virginian on NBC and Wagon Train on ABC.

CBS Reports continued to lead the network's Wednesday primetime line-up until Fall 1965, when the network placed Lost In Space in the 7:30 p.m. Wednesday timeslot and moved CBS Reports to Tuesday at 10 p.m., opposite The Fugitive on ABC and NBC's Tuesday Night at the Movies.

Notable episodes
CBS Reports received a Peabody Award in 1960 for the episode "Harvest of Shame", which examined the lives of migrant workers in the United States. CBS Reports also received Peabody Awards for Storm Over the Supreme Court, KKK - The Invisible Empire, The Poisoned Air, Hunger in America, The Battle for South Africa, The Boston Goes to China, The Vanishing Family - Crisis in Black America, D-Day, and for Roger Mudd's interview with Ted Kennedy.

1961's Biography of a Bookie Joint, which documented an illegal bookmaking establishment in Boston, was nominated for the Primetime Emmy Award for Program of the Year. Boston Police Commissioner Leo J. Sullivan was forced to resign after the episode, which showed members of his department visiting the gambling establishment.

CBS Reports: The Homosexuals, which aired in 1967, was the first time homosexuality was presented on a national network broadcast. "The Homosexuals" was praised for debunking negative stereotypes, but also condemned for generalizations and promoting other stereotypes. LGBT activist Wayne Besen called "The Homosexuals" "the single most destructive hour of antigay propaganda in our nation's history." Gay Power, Gay Politics, which aired in 1980, was also criticized for unfairly misrepresenting a number of sexual issues, reinforcing stereotypes, and making homosexuals appear as threats to public decency. CBS later apologized for manipulating the soundtrack of a speech made by San Francisco Mayor Dianne Feinstein the first time that the LGBT community had received an apology from a major news organization.

In 1982, General William Westmoreland sued George Crile III, Mike Wallace, and CBS for libel after the network aired The Uncounted Enemy, which contended that Westmoreland had manipulated intelligence reports about enemy strength in order to create the impression of progress. Westmoreland dropped his lawsuit, Westmoreland v. CBS; however, CBS lost its libel insurance over the case.

Revivals
The CBS Reports banner was brought back into use in 2009, with the series CBS Reports: Children of the Recession. Instead of being a stand-alone documentary, the new incarnation consisted of reports across all CBS News platforms. Katie Couric led coverage. The series of reports won the a Columbia School of Journalism Alfred DuPont Award. In January 2010, a second Couric-led series aired, CBS Reports: Where America Stands.

In 2016, CBSN streaming service launched CBSN Originals, a documentary series sponsored by pharmaceutical company Pfizer. Adam Yamaguchi, who before joining CBSN served as an executive producer and a correspondent for award-winning Vanguard series on Current TV, became executive producer and a correspondent for the project. Yamaguchi noted in an interview that unlike linear TV, streaming television allows the stories to be as short, or as long, as they need to be and provides incredible creative freedom. The same journalistic rigor is applied to the reporting irrespective of the format and platform.

In 2022, the CBSN Originals project was rebranded as CBS Reports. Each CBS Reports documentary "takes a deep dive into key issues driving national and global conversations. The stories cover a wide range of topics such as the ripple effects of America’s culture wars, climate change, the rise in extremism, the economic shifts impacting communities to countries and the ways technologies are both saving and threatening humanity".

CBSN Originals/CBS Reports episodes

Season 1
For the first season Paramount+ website shows four episodes, TV Guide shows five episodes, while CBSN YouTube playlist shows six episodes. The latter has been used for the list below.

Season 2

Season 3

See also 
 The 90's (1989-1992)
 Vanguard (2008-2013)
 Fault Lines (2009-2018)
 Vice

References

 
1959 American television series debuts
1950s American documentary television series
1960s American documentary television series
1970s American documentary television series
1980s American documentary television series
1990s American documentary television series
2000s American documentary television series
2010s American documentary television series

American television series revived after cancellation
Peabody Award-winning television programs